Cofactor of BRCA1, also known as COBRA1, is a human gene that encodes NELF-B.

Function 
NELF-B is a subunit of negative elongation factor (NELF), which also includes NELF-A (WHSC2; MIM 606026), either NELF-C or NELF-D (TH1L; MIM 605297), and NELF-E (RDBP; MIM 154040). NELF acts with DRB sensitivity-inducing factor (DSIF), a heterodimer of SPT4 (SUPT4H1; MIM 603555) and SPT5 (SUPT5H; MIM 602102), to cause transcriptional pausing of RNA polymerase II (see MIM 180660).  COBRA1 was initially identified in a yeast two-hybrid screen using the BRCT1 domain of BRCA1 as bait.

Interactions 
Cofactor of BRCA1 has been shown to interact with:
 BRCA1
 C-Fos,
 C-jun,
 Estrogen receptor alpha,
 RDBP,  and
 TH1L.

References

Further reading